Thiruporur taluk is a taluk in Chengalpattu district of the Indian state of Tamil Nadu. The headquarters of the taluk is the town of Thiruporur.

History
This taluk was created by the former chief minister J.Jayalalithaa in 2012 bifurcating Chengalpattu Taluk due to population increase.

Thiruporur taluk was previously a part of the Kanchipuram district. After the bifurcation of Kanchipuram district, Thiruporur taluk became a part of the Chengalpattu district.

Administration
The taluk is administered by the Tahsildar office located in Thiruporur.

Villages 
There are 57 villages in the newly created Thiruporur taluk. The headquarters of the taluk is Thiruporur.

References 

Category orchid pharmaceutical chemical company Sidco industrial area alathur
Taluks of Chengalpattu district